The Tablelands Advertiser is the weekly newspaper published for residents of the Atherton Tableland and Mareeba area.

The Tablelands Advertiser has a home delivery system that covers around four times the area of any other publication in the region. This means that over half of the 18,729 copies are delivered to homes, cattle stations and farms throughout the Far Northern rural region.

See also
Cairns Post
Cairns Sun
Port Douglas and Mossman Gazette

Far North Queensland
Newspapers published in Queensland
News Corp Australia
Weekly newspapers published in Australia
Mareeba